Vamps is a 2012 American comedy horror film directed by Amy Heckerling and starring Alicia Silverstone and Krysten Ritter. It was released on November 2, 2012.

In the film Silverstone and Ritter play best friends Goody and Stacy, two vampires who do their best to keep up with trends and stay youthful while at the same time abstaining from blood.

Plot
Stacy (Krysten Ritter) and Goody (Alicia Silverstone), are two vampires enjoying life in New York City. Goody was turned in 1841 by the vampire Ciccerus (Sigourney Weaver). After leaving the man she fell in love with in the 1960s, she struggled with her life as a vampire until Stacy was turned by Ciccerus sometime during the early 1990s. Goody was able to teach Stacy how to use her new abilities, like sustaining themselves on rat blood, while Stacy helps Goody stay youthful and trendy. Goody keeps her actual age a secret because she is afraid of being viewed as old by Stacy. While at a vampire meeting, Goody discovers that if their maker or "stem" Ciccerus is ever killed, she and Stacy would revert to their human ages.

While working at a hospital as an exterminator, Goody runs into her ex-boyfriend Danny (Richard Lewis), whom she has not seen since the 1960s. They re-connect under the pretense that she is Goody's daughter, but Danny eventually learns the truth when he sees her bite into another man to prevent a stroke. When he asks why she left him, Goody explains that even though she loved him, she did not want to stand in his way of finding someone he could actually build a life with.

Meanwhile, the government is using the Patriot Act to track down vampires, causing panic amongst the vampire's anonymous group. Goody comes up with a plan to delete and change all the information about all the vampires in the New York area during a solar eclipse. After they succeed the vamps throw a party for both human and non-human feeders, but all is endangered by the threat of Ciccerus who didn't attend and massacred an entire restaurant full of people.

Stacy begins a relationship with a young college student named Joey (Dan Stevens). It is soon revealed that Joey is the son of the infamous vampire slayer Dr. Van Helsing (Wallace Shawn) who is in town to find and kill vampires. After spending the night at Joey's place, he sees Stacy crawling down the side of his apartment building in order to get home before the sun rises. Despite his initial shock, Joey accepts that Stacy is a vampire and the two resume dating. Stacy soon discovers she is pregnant, and is informed that the baby will not survive unless she becomes human again, which can only happen if they kill Ciccerus.

The girls team up with Joey and Dr. Van Helsing and after a struggle, they end up killing Ciccerus so that Stacy can keep her baby and have a future with Joey. Stacy looks relatively the same despite being forty years old, but Goody rapidly ages into an old woman. Revealing her actual age, Goody accompanies Joey and Stacy to Times Square where Goody reminisces about her life. As the sun rises, she disintegrates into ash.

A few years later, Stacy and Joey show up at Dr. Van Helsing's house to pick up their young daughter, whom they have named after Goody. As Van Helsing plays with his granddaughter, he notices that the little girl sports a set of vampire fangs, but rather than being horrified he seems amused.

Cast

Production

Casting
Alicia Silverstone, who had already starred in Heckerling's Clueless, was offered the role after Heckerling came to see her in Time Stands Still. Krysten Ritter was Heckerling's first choice for the role of Stacy. Michelle Pfeiffer was initially offered the role of Ciccerus but had to turn it down due to scheduling commitments. Taylor Negron's pizza deliveryman character was a nod to Heckerling's earlier film Fast Times at Ridgemont High, where Negron's character delivers a pizza to Jeff Spicoli (Sean Penn) in a high school classroom.

Filming
Principal photography lasted 37 days in Detroit, while using New York for exterior shots. Red Hour Films produced the film, alongside Lucky Monkey Pictures.

Release 
A limited theatrical release began on November 2, 2012, followed by a Blu-ray and DVD release.

Reception 
Rotten Tomatoes gives the film a 56% based on 18 reviews from critics, with an average rating of 5.47/10.

See also
Vampire film

References

External links
 
 
 
 

2012 films
2012 comedy horror films
2010s buddy comedy films
2010s English-language films
2010s female buddy films
American buddy comedy films
American comedy horror films
American female buddy films
American vampire films
Films directed by Amy Heckerling
Films scored by David Kitay
Films set in New York City
Films shot in Detroit
Films shot in New York City
Films with screenplays by Amy Heckerling
Red Hour Productions films
Vampire comedy films
2010s American films